The Florence Network is a cross-nation European co-operation of nursing and midwifery departments from 18 different countries. It includes a total of 38 institutions across Europe. It focuses on international cooperation over educational and scientific issues, with the aim to develop and increase the quality of higher education in nursing, midwifery and health care. In this way the organization works to improve the image of the profession and to raise the profile of nursing and midwifery within Europe.

Primary goals

The Florence Network's stated goals are principally concerned with European nursing and midwifery. They include organising student and lecturer exchange between network members, improving curriculum quality and facilitating research collaboration.

It is hoped that the network will help with identified issues in nursing, such as an aging workforce, nursing shortages in higher-income EU countries, workplace dissatisfaction in lower-income countries, and a need for more culturally sensitive healthcare.

Member Countries 

Institutions join the network by invitation only, but do not pay membership fees. As of 2019, forty higher education institutions (HEIs) from the following European nations are members of the network:

Belgium
Czech Republic
Denmark
England
Finland
Germany
Greece
Italy
Latvia
Netherlands
Norway
Portugal
Scotland
Slovakia
Slovenia
Spain
Sweden
Switzerland
Turkey

Annual Meeting
Every year one of the partners - institutions of higher education (Universities of applied Sciences) is the host institution for the Annual Meeting.

1995    Start of Florence Network - Groningen - Netherlands
1996    Copenhagen, Oslo,
1997    Stockholm,  Aalst, Belgium
1998    Bremen, Germany
1999    Rovaniemi, Finland
2000    Prague, Czech Republic
2001    Lahti, Finland
2002    Edinburgh, Scotland
2003    Porsgrunn, Norway
2004    Udine, Italy
2005    Leuven, Belgium
2006    Napier University, Edinburgh, Scotland
2007    Halmstad University, Varberg, Sweden
2008    Masaryk University, Brno, Czech Republic
2009    The Hague University, The Hague, Netherlands
2010    Ege University, Izmir, Turkey
2011    ESEL, Lisbon, Portugal
2012    Malmö University, Sweden
2013    Hanzehogeschool, Groningen / NHL, Leeuwarden, Netherlands
2014    TurgutOzal University, Ankara, Turkey
2015    Metropolitan University College, Copenhagen /University College Zealand, Roskilde, Denmark
2016    University of Verona & Trento Campus, Italy
2017    Bern UAS, Zurich UAS & St. Gallen UAS, Bern & Winterthur, Switzerland 
2018    Odisee, Belgium
2019    Coventry, England

References

External links
The Florence Network

 
Medical and health organizations based in Europe